Terry Butler is an Australian former soccer player.

Playing career

Club career
Butler player for APIA Leichhardt between 1971 and 1988, apart from a short stint with Urban Services in Hong Kong.

International career
Butler played four matches for Australia, including two full international matches.

References

External links
 Terry Butler at Aussie Footballers

Australian soccer players
Australia international soccer players
National Soccer League (Australia) players
Year of birth missing (living people)
Living people
Place of birth missing (living people)
Association football forwards
APIA Leichhardt FC players